The Cuban night lizard (Cricosaura typica) is a night lizard (family Xantusiidae, subfamily Cricosaurinae) endemic to southern Cuba.  It is the only member of the genus Cricosaura, one of three in the night lizard family.

Etymology
Cricosaura is derived from the Greek words "krikos" and "saura" meaning "ring lizard", perhaps in reference to the rings of caudal scales.
The name "typica", from the Greek word "typikos", means "typical".

Description
The Cuban night lizard differs from the other night lizards in possessing two frontonasal scales, one frontal scale, no parietal scale, and a fourth finger with four phalanges.
With a snout-vent length less than 4 cm it is the smallest of the night lizards.

Distribution
Cricosaura typica lives exclusively in the west corner of the southernmost coast of Cuba in the Provinces of Granma and Santiago de Cuba up to 200 m altitude. Known localities for Granma Province include: Hoyo de la Campana, Cabo Cruz (type locality); Vereón; Monte Gordo; Playa Las Coloradas; Currín; Agua Fina; Bosque Castillo; Belic; Bajada al Pesquero de la Alegría; Pesquero de la Alegría; Alegría de Pío/Municipio Niquero; 2.4 km SE of Ojo del Toro; Caleta Media Luna; Punta de Piedra; Alto de Mareón; Marea del Portillo; Camarón Grande. In the Santiago de Cuba Province the species is known only from La Mula (southern slopes of Sierra Maestra) and Uvero (ca. 80 km west of Santiago de Cuba on route 20, easternmost record).

Habitat and natural history
Cricosaura typica is a xerophilic species which hides under rocks, stones, logs, and debris in xeric forest and woods in microhabitats with at least some humidity. It is crepuscular and to some degree diurnal but lives very secretive. In their habitats it is quite common and can be easily collected during the day. In loose soil it progresses by snake-like wiggling and head movement. It feeds on insects (mainly ants), other small arthropods (Spiders, diplopods) and also on molluscs and gastropods.

Cricosaura typica is the only egg-laying species in the family Xantusiidae. At oviposition, mainly between April and June on Cuba, the white eggs are 9,4-10,7 mm long. Incubation time is up to 60 days. Hatchlings measure 15 mm from snout to vent. Longevity in captivity is reported up to 2 years 11 month.

Conservation status
This species is listened in Red List Category Vulnerable B2a,b(iii) for Cuba.
The main threat is the fragmentation and loss of habitat due to deforestation through human activities such as farming (minor crops), cutting down trees and setting fires. It is also threatened by the introduction of invasive alien animal species and adverse natural events. Although some of the populations of Cricosaura are situated in a protected area, the level of study and management are inadequate. The populations outside the boundaries of the protected area are the most threatened.

References

Further reading
Armas, L. F., Rams, A. & Torres, A. 1987. Primeras observaciones sobre la alimentación de Cricosaura typica (Sauria: Xantusiidae) en condiciones naturales. Misc. Zool. 32: 1–2. (in Spanish)
Barbour, T. & Ramsden, C.T. 1919. The herpetology of Cuba. Mem. Mus. Comp. Zool. 47(2): 71-213.
Crother, B.I. 1988. Cricosaura, C. typica. Catalogue of American Amphibians and Reptiles 443: 1–3.
Díaz, L. M., Estrada, A.R., Berovides, V. & Moreno, L.V. 1997. Ecología, reproducción y conservación de la lagartija de hojarasca Cricosaura typica (Sauria: Xantusiidae). In: IV Simposio de Zoología, La Habana (Instituto de Ecología y Sistemática), Resúmenes, pp. 79. (in Spanish)
Diaz, L.M. 2007. Die Erhaltungszucht von Cricosaura typica. Aquaristik-Fachmagazin 195, 39 (3): 106–108. (in German)
Estrada, A. R. & Armas, L.F. de. 1998. Apuntes ecológicos sobre Cricosaura typica (Sauria: Xantusiidae) de Cuba. Caribb. J. Sci. 34(1-2): 157–160. (in Spanish)
Fernández de Arcila, R. 1990. Datos ecológicos de Cricosaura typica Gundlach et Peters (Sauria: Xantusiidae) en el Gran Parque Nacional Sierra Maestra. Trabajo de Diploma, Universidad de La Habana, Cuba, 119 p. (in Spanish)
Fong, A., Viña, R. & Arias, A. 1999. Aspectos de la Historia Natural de Cricosaura typica (Sauria: Xantusiidae) de Cuba. Caribbean Journal of Science 35(1-2): 148–150. (in Spanish)
Fong, A. & Bignotte-Giró, I. 2009. Zur Kenntnis einer Unbekannten: Cricosaura typica, die Kuba-Nachtechse. Terraria, Nr. 18, 4(4): 58–62. (in German)
Moreno, L. V. 1987. Primeras observaciones sobre Cricosaura typica (Squamata: Xantusiidae) en cautiverio. Cien. Biol. 17: 104–108. (in Spanish)
Noonan, B.P., Pramuk, J.B., Bezy, R.L., Sinclair, E.A., Queiroz, K. de & Sites Jr., J.W. 2013. Phylogenetic relationships within the lizard clade Xantusiidae: Using trees and divergence times to address evolutionary questions at multiple levels. Molecular Phylogenetics and Evolution 69: 109–122.
Peters, W.C. 1863. Über eine neue von Hrn. Dr. Gundlach auf Cuba entdeckte Sauriergattung, Cricosaura typica Gundlach et Peters. Monatsber. Akad. Wiss. Berlin 1863: 362–368. (in German)
Petzold, H.G. 1969. Cricosaura typica Gundlach & Peters, eine herpetologische Kostbarkeit aus Kuba. Aquar. Terrar. 22 (3): 82–85. (in German)
Sanz Ochotorena, A., Díaz, L.M., Murphy, R. & Domínguez, C. 2003. Morphology of the Gonads of Cricosaura typica (Sauria: Xantusiidae). Microsc. Microanal. 9 (Suppl 2): 1510–1511.
Savage, J.M. 1963. Studies on the lizard family Xantusiidae. IV. The Genera. Contrib. Sci., Los Angeles Co. Mus. Nat. Hist. 71: 1-38.
Savage, J.M. 1964. Studies on the lizard family Xantusiidae. V. The Cuban night lizard, Cricosaura typica Gundlach and Peters. Copeia 1964(3):536-542.
Schwartz, A. & Henderson, R.W. 1991. Amphibians and Reptiles of the West Indies. University of Florida Press, Gainesville, 720 pp.

Night lizards
Endemic fauna of Cuba
Reptiles of Cuba
Reptiles described in 1863
Taxa named by Juan Gundlach
Taxa named by Wilhelm Peters